Quarxs was one of the earliest computer animated series, predating ReBoot, and the first one produced in HD. It was aired between 1990 and 1993.

Each episode was made in HDTV and lasted no more than three minutes. Only twelve episodes of the original series of 100 have been created. The title was meant to describe a common name on mysterious, omnipresent and invisible creatures that were bending the laws of physics, biology, and optics, discovered by a cryptobiology researcher. The Quarxs are presented as being the only and last explanation of the imperfection of the world.

Quarxs is the only fiction animated series by Maurice Benayoun, contemporary artist who dedicates his later work to media art. The series was conceived together with François Schuiten well known Belgian comic book designer. Quarxs has been widely awarded in international events and festivals such as SIGGRAPH, Imagina, Ars Electronica, ISEA, Images du Futur, Sitges, Tampere, and the International Monitor Award. The series has been broadcast in more than 15 countries around the world.

At the time, CG animation was considered new media.

Creatures
 Amperophile; Attracted to electrical currents
 Carno-lampire; A quarx mentioned, but still not described
 Elasto fragmentoplast; Breaks small objects
 Electricia; Causes electrical incidents
 Mille-folio; Lays between the animate and the inanimate
 Mnemochrome; Copies artworks
 Paleoquarxs; Considered a range of primitive Quarxs
 Partio scopa dextra; Visible only from the right side
 Polymorpho Proximens; Takes the shape of nearby objects
 Reverso chronocycli; Reverses the flow of time
 Spatio Striata Exists; Only present in some slices of space
 Spiro Thermophage; Absorbs the heat in plumbing systems

Awards
Quarxs received numerous awards, shown below.

 Finalist, International Monitor Awards, Los Angeles, USA, October 1995.
 Official selection, Film West, Sydney, Australia, August 1995.
 Prize of the Best European Animation Film, Prix Jose Abel, Cinanima, Espinho, Portugal, October 1994.
 Silver Trophy, "Espace Creation", F.A.U.S.T., Toulouse, France, November 1994.
 Official selection, Antenna Cinema, Festival of TV series, Treviso, Italy, September 1994.
 Official selection, Electronic Theater, 5 Th. International Symposium on Electronic Art, ISEA, Helsinki, Finland, August 1994.
 Official Selection, XXVII e INTERNATIONAL Festival of Fantastic Film, Sitges, Spain, July 1994.
 Official Selections, SIGGRAPH, Electronic Theater, Orlando, United States, May 1994.
 SIGGRAPH, Screenings, Orlando, USA, May 1994.
 Special Effects Screenings, Cannes Festival, May 1994.
 Opening movie, " Concours Nouvelles Technologies France Télévision/Art3000 ", Paris, May 1994.
 Distinction (2nd Prize, after Jurassic Park) Ars Electronica, Linz, Austria, June 1994.
 Official Selection, Animation Film Festival, Cardiff, Scotland, April 1994.
 Official Selection, Short Film Festival, Tampere, Finland, Mars 1994.
 3rd Prize Fiction category, IMAGINA 94, Monte-Carlo, Monaco, February 1994.
 Official Selection, International Animation Film Festival, Brussels, Belgium, February 1994.
 3rd Prize, Fiction category, IMAGINA ‘93, Monte-Carlo, Monaco, February 1993.
 Official Selection, SIGGRAPH, Chicago, USA, July 1992.
 Official Selection, 5th Festival of Computer Animation, Geneva, Switzerland, May 1992.
 Official Selection, IMAGINA 92, Monte-Carlo, Monaco, January 1992.
 Third Dimension Award, SCAM, Paris, FRANCE, November 1991.
 Best Screenplay award, Paris Cité ‘91, Paris, FRANCE, October 1991.
 Official Selection, EUROGRAPHICS 91, Vienna, Austria, September 1991.
 Honorary Mention, Ars Electronica, Linz, Austria, September 1991.
 Official Selection, Images du Futur, Montreal, Canada, September 1991.
 1st Prize, Artistic Animation Category, Truevision Videographic Competition, SIGGRAPH, Las Vegas, USA, July 1991.

References

External links
 IMDB profile: Quarxs
  Maurice Benayoun's official web site
  Quarxs's official web site
  Quarxs web site
 Z-A Production web site, producer of the Quarxs
   Maurice Benayoun's New Quarxs Page

French computer-animated television series
1990s French animated television series
1990 French television series debuts
1993 French television series endings
French children's animated fantasy television series
French children's animated mystery television series